Amity University may refer to one of several universities in India:

 Amity University, Gurgaon, in Haryana
 Amity University, Gwalior, in Madhya Pradesh
 Amity University, Jaipur, in Rajasthan
 Amity University, Jharkhand, in Ranchi, Jharkhand
 Amity University, Kolkata, in West Bengal
 Amity University, Mumbai, in Maharashtra
 Amity University, Noida, in Uttar Pradesh
 Amity University, Patna, in Bihar
 Amity University, Raipur, in Chhattisgarh

See also
 Amity (disambiguation)